Eastern Orthodoxy in the Philippines refers to the Eastern Orthodox presence in the Philippines as a whole.

Overview
In 1989, Adamopoulos saw the need to establish the first Greek Orthodox church in the Philippines and thus established the Hellenic Orthodox Foundation, Inc., but he died in 1993 before the church was completed. The Annunciation Orthodox Cathedral in Sucat, Parañaque, Metro Manila, was finished in 1996 and was consecrated by Ecumenical Patriarch Bartholomew I of Constantinople in 2000.

Since then, other autocephalous Eastern Orthodox churches have established their presence in the Philippines, particularly in Mindanao. Alongside the local Greek community, a small community of Serbians and Russians living in the Philippines conduct services here.

There is an estimated number of 200,000 Eastern Orthodox Christians living in the country. Those E. O. belong to the Moscow Patriarchate, to the Patriarchate of Antioch, and to the Ecumenical Patriarchate.

Churches
There are three autocephalous Eastern Orthodox churches with a presence in the country, the jurisdictions of which overlap with each other. These are:
 the Antiochian Orthodox Christian Mission in the Philippines, under the Antiochian Orthodox Christian Archdiocese of Australia, New Zealand and the Philippines of the Greek Orthodox Patriarchate of Antioch and All the East;
 the Exarchate of the Philippines, under the Orthodox Metropolitanate of Hong Kong and Southeast Asia of the Ecumenical Patriarchate of Constantinople; and
 the Patriarchate of Moscow, the jurisdiction of which is divided into:
the Diocese of the Philippines and Vietnam, under the Patriarchal Exarchate in Southeast Asia; and
 the Philippine Mission of the Russian Orthodox Church outside Russia, under the semiautonomous Russian Orthodox Church outside Russia.

There are also groups in the country which use the term orthodox in their names but which are not in communion with any of the fourteen to seventeen recognized autocephalous Eastern Orthodox churches.

References

External links
Philippines: The Dawn of Orthodoxy, Serbian Orthodox Church
Orthodoxy in the Philippines, OrthodoxWiki